Cnemaspis aurantiacopes, also known as Hon Dat rock gecko, is a species of gecko endemic to southern Vietnam.

References

Cnemaspis
Lizards of Asia
Reptiles described in 2007